The women's giant slalom competition at the 2015 World Championships was held on 12 February 2015.

Results
The first run was started at 10:15 local time (UTC−7) and the second run at 14:15.

References

Women's giant slalom
2015 in American women's sports
FIS